Hybolasius pumilus is a species of beetle in the family Cerambycidae. It was described by Francis Polkinghorne Pascoe in 1876. It is known from New Zealand.

References

Hybolasius
Beetles described in 1876